Guido Pepoli (May 6, 1560 – June 1599) was an Italian cardinal. He was ordained by Pope Sixtus V on December 20, 1589 and held office of Treasurer of His Holiness. From January 15, 1590 to February 6, 1592 he was Cardinal-Deacon of Sts. Cosmas and Damian, in Rome, and, later, Cardinal-Deacon of S. Eustachio, in Rome, until January 8, 1596. Then, succeeding to Cardinal Costanzo da Sarnano, he was ordained Cardinal-Priest of S. Pietro in Montorio, in Rome, until he died, in June 1599, at 39 years old.

References

External links
 Genteel escutcheon.

16th-century Italian cardinals
1560 births
1599 deaths